The East Bay Daily News was a free daily newspaper in Berkeley, California published 5 days a week with an average daily circulation of 10,000. The newspaper was founded May 20, 2005 by journalist Dave Price and Jim Pavelich, who also published the Palo Alto Daily News. The East Bay Daily News was distributed in large red newspaper racks and in stores, coffee shops, restaurants, schools and major workplaces in Berkeley, Albany, Piedmont and Oakland. After McClatchy's acquisition of the paper's previous owner Knight Ridder in early 2006, the Palo Alto Daily News group, including the East Bay Daily News, was bundled with the San Jose Mercury News and sold to MediaNews Group of Denver, Colorado.

External links
 East Bay Daily News Official Website

MediaNews Group publications
Daily newspapers published in the San Francisco Bay Area
Free daily newspapers
Publications established in 2005